The WSE Cup is an annual European club roller hockey competition organised by the World Skate Europe - Rink Hockey since 1980. It is the second most important club competition and features teams who did not qualify for the top-tier WSE Champions League. The winners of the WSE Cup earn the right to play the WSE Continental Cup against the winners of the WSE Champions League.

Format
The World Skate Europe Cup is a two-legged knockout competition between the 16 clubs qualified. To determine these 16 teams, a preliminary round is played. The last four teams advance to a final-four playoff, organized by one of the four contestant clubs.

Finals

Performances

By club

By country

External links

 
Roller hockey competitions in Europe
Recurring sporting events established in 1980
1980 establishments in Europe
Multi-national professional sports leagues